Bojan Krstevski (born 4 June 1989) is a Macedonian professional basketball player born in Skopje. He currently plays for MZT Skopje. He is also a member of the North Macedonia men's national basketball team.

References

External links
 http://basketball.realgm.com/player/Bojan-Krstevski/Summary/26270
 https://www.basketball-reference.com/euro/players/bojan-krstevski-1.html

Living people
1989 births
Kavala B.C. players
KK Rabotnički players
KK Vardar players
Macedonian men's basketball players
Sportspeople from Skopje